Callum Jones (born 02 October 2001) is a Welsh professional footballer who most recently played as a defender for League Two side Newport County.

Playing career

Jones is a product of the Newport County academy. On 12 November 2019 Jones made his debut for Newport as a second-half substitute for Matt Dolan in the 7–4 win against Cheltenham Town in the EFL Trophy Southern Group E. In January 2020, Jones joined Slimbridge on loan until the end of the 2019–20 season. Jones was released by Newport County at the end of the 2019–20 season.

External links

References

Living people
Welsh footballers
Association football defenders
Newport County A.F.C. players
2002 births
Slimbridge A.F.C. players
Southern Football League players
Footballers from Swansea